Duncan Peninsula is an ice-covered peninsula,  long, which forms the eastern part of Carney Island, along the coast of Marie Byrd Land. It was delineated from aerial photographs taken by U.S. Navy Operation Highjump in January 1947, and was named by the Advisory Committee on Antarctic Names for Admiral Donald B. Duncan, U.S. Navy, Vice Chief of Naval Operations under Admiral Robert Carney during the International Geophysical Year period of 1957–58.

See also
 Cape Leahy, northernmost tip

References 

Peninsulas of Marie Byrd Land